Fear Factor: Khatron Ke Khiladi Darr vs Dare is the eleventh season of Fear Factor: Khatron Ke Khiladi, an Indian reality and stunt television series produced by Endemol Shine India. The show aired from  17 July 2021 to 26 September 2021, on Colors TV. Filmed in Cape Town, South Africa, it was hosted by Rohit Shetty. Arjun Bijlani emerged as winner of this season while Divyanka Tripathi became the 1st runner up.

Contestants

Elimination chart
 
 
 Nominated By Arjun Using K Medal
 Captain of respective team:  Team Rahul  Team Shweta
 Vishal Proxies Varun due to injury
  Pairs during Partner Week
 All contestants received Fear Funda performed stunts together
 Varun Proxies Vishal due to injury
 No Stunts performed 

  Winner
  1st runner-up
  2nd runner-up
 Finalists
 Ticket to finale 
 The contestant won the stunt. 
 The contestant lost the stunt and received Fear Funda.
 The contestant got rid of Fear Funda by winning pre-elimination stunt.
 The contestant was placed in the bottom and performed elimination stunt
 The contestant was safe from elimination by winning elimination stunt.
 The contestant was eliminated
 The contestant was exempted from performing stunts in the entire week
 The contestant lost the K Medal/Ticket to Finale Race
 Injury

Crossover

Finalists of this season and host Rohit Shetty appeared on Dance Deewane 3 in an episode named as Mahasangam.
The episodes was aired on 18–19 September 2021.

Guest appearances

References

External links
 
 Khatron Ke Khiladi 11 on Voot

2021 Indian television seasons
11
Colors TV original programming